Carlos Miguel Pereira Fernandes (born 9 January 1991), better known as just Cuca, is a footballer who plays as a midfielder for Casa Pia. Born in Portugal, he represents the Cape Verde national team.

Professional career
A youth product of Oeiras, Cuca began his career with the club in 2009, and had stints thereafter with 1º Dezembro, Omonia Aradippou, and Felgueiras. On 6 July 2018, he transferred to Mafra. Cuca made his professional debut with Mafra in a 4–1 Liga Portugal 2 win over Estoril on 23 September 2018.

International career
Born in Portugal, Cuca is of Cape Verdean descent. He was called up to the Cape Verde national team for a pair of friendlies in June 2021. He debuted with the Cape Verde national team in a friendly 2–0 loss to Senegal on 8 June 2021.

References

External links
 
 

1991 births
Footballers from Lisbon
Portuguese people of Cape Verdean descent
Citizens of Cape Verde through descent
Living people
Portuguese footballers
Cape Verdean footballers
Cape Verde international footballers
Association football midfielders
AD Oeiras players
S.U. 1º Dezembro players
Omonia Aradippou players
F.C. Felgueiras 1932 players
C.D. Mafra players
Casa Pia A.C. players
Liga Portugal 2 players
Segunda Divisão players
Campeonato de Portugal (league) players
Cypriot Second Division players
Cape Verdean expatriate footballers
Expatriate footballers in Cyprus
Cape Verdean expatriate sportspeople in Cyprus